Jorge Díaz was a Chilean boxer. He competed in the men's lightweight event at the 1928 Summer Olympics.

References

External links
 

Year of birth missing
Year of death missing
Chilean male boxers
Olympic boxers of Chile
Boxers at the 1928 Summer Olympics
Place of birth missing
Lightweight boxers
20th-century Chilean people